Chinese University Basketball Association (CUBA) was founded in 1996 and the league was launched in 1998. It is the most competitive and popular college basketball competition in China. This event is held annually and divided into the preliminary stage and the final stage, in which the national championship team is decided through a bracket style elimination event. In 2015, the competing Chinese University Basketball Super League (CUBS) merged into CUBA.

Unlike other Chinese athletic organizations, CUBA is a privately funded organization with no affiliation with the Chinese government. Similar to that of the NCAA, the rules of CUBA grant eligibility only to amateur players. CUBA was originally intended to mirror the NCAA Men's Basketball.

Divisions 
The league is divided into four divisions, mostly based on the geographical location of the teams. The top two teams in each division qualify for the CUBA Big Eight (quarter-finals).

National champions 
 Men's
 1999 University of Electronic Science and Technology of China
 2000 Huaqiao University
 2001 Northeast Normal University
 2002 Shandong University of Science and Technology
 2003 Huaqiao University
 2004 Huazhong University of Science and Technology
 2005 Huaqiao University
 2006 Huaqiao University
 2007 Huaqiao University
 2008 Huaqiao University
 2009 China University of Mining and Technology
 2010 Taiyuan University of Technology
 2011 Huaqiao University
 2012 Taiyuan University of Technology
 2013 Huaqiao University
 2014 Peking University
 2015 Huaqiao University
 2016 Tsinghua University
 2017 Peking University
 2018 Peking University
2019 Peking University

Women's
 1999 Tianjin University of Finance and Economics
 2000 China University of Mining and Technology
 2001 Tianjin University of Finance and Economics
 2002 Tianjin University of Finance and Economics
 2003 Tianjin University of Finance and Economics
 2004 Tianjin University of Finance and Economics
 2005 Tianjin University of Finance and Economics
 2006 Tianjin University of Finance and Economics
 2007 Tianjin University of Finance and Economics
 2008 Tianjin University of Finance and Economics
 2009 Beijing Normal University
 2010 Beijing Normal University
 2011 Beijing Normal University
 2012 Beijing Normal University
 2013 Beijing Normal University

Source:

See also 
 Sport in China
 China men's national basketball team
 China women's national basketball team
 Chinese Basketball Association (CBA)
 National Basketball League (China) (NBL)
 Women's Chinese Basketball Association (WCBA)

References

External links 
 

Basketball leagues in China
College basketball